Choi Kwang-hee (born ) is a South Korean volleyball coach, and was a player, as a wing spiker.

She was part of the South Korea women's national volleyball team at the 1996 Summer Olympics, 2000 Summer Olympics and 2004 Summer Olympics. She also competed at the 2002 FIVB Volleyball Women's World Championship in Germany. 
On club level she played with Korea Tobacco & Ginseng.

Clubs
  Hanll Synthetic Fiber (1993–1998)
  Korea Tobacco & Ginseng (1998–2007)

References

External links
http://mengnews.joins.com/view.aspx?aId=3028260
https://web.archive.org/web/20140410202937/http://www.volleyball.org/korea/olympic_team96.html
Choi Kwang-hee at fivb.org

Choi Kwang-hee Fancafe at Daum 
http://www.gettyimages.com/detail/news-photo/south-koreas-choi-kwang-hee-spikes-the-ball-over-cuban-news-photo/51105018#south-koreas-choi-kwanghee-spikes-the-ball-over-cuban-player-barros-picture-id51105018
http://www.alamy.com/stock-photo-south-koreas-choi-spikes-the-ball-in-the-womens-volleyball-world-qualification-121411996.html

1974 births
Living people
South Korean women's volleyball players
Asian Games medalists in volleyball
Sportspeople from Gyeonggi Province
Volleyball players at the 1996 Summer Olympics
Volleyball players at the 2000 Summer Olympics
Volleyball players at the 2004 Summer Olympics
Olympic volleyball players of South Korea
Volleyball players at the 2002 Asian Games
Kyung Hee University alumni
Asian Games silver medalists for South Korea
Medalists at the 2002 Asian Games